Titus Brown (February 11, 1786 – January 29, 1849) was an American politician and a United States Representative from New Hampshire.

Early life
Born in Alstead, New Hampshire, Brown graduated from Middlebury College in Vermont in 1811. He then studied law; was admitted to the bar and commenced practice in Reading, Vermont in 1814.

Career
Brown moved to Francestown, New Hampshire in 1817 and continued the practice of law. He was a member of the New Hampshire House of Representatives 1820–1825, and was the Solicitor of Hillsborough County 1823–1825 and 1829–1834.

Elected as an Adams Republican candidate to the Nineteenth and Twentieth Congresses, Brown was United States Representative for the state of New Hampshire from (March 4, 1825 – March 3, 1829). In 1829, he was not a candidate for reelection. After leaving Congress, he was a member of the New Hampshire Senate and served as its president in 1842. He was school superintendent for many years in Francestown and also was the chairman of the boards of bank and railroad commissioners at the time of his death.

Death
Brown died in Francestown, Hillsborough County, New Hampshire, on January 29, 1849 (age 62 years, 353 days). He is interred at Mill Village Cemetery, Francestown, New Hampshire.

Family life
Son of Elias Jr. and Rebecca Keyes Brown, he married Jerusha Cadwell Hutchinson, and they had two children Linsley Keyes Brown and Emily Hutchinson Brown.

References

External list

Titus Brown (1786–1849)

1786 births
1849 deaths
Members of the United States House of Representatives from New Hampshire
Middlebury College alumni
People from Alstead, New Hampshire
People from Francestown, New Hampshire
New Hampshire National Republicans
Presidents of the New Hampshire Senate
New Hampshire state senators
Members of the New Hampshire House of Representatives
National Republican Party members of the United States House of Representatives
19th-century American politicians